Captain Byron Curtis Weston (April 9, 1832 – November 8, 1898) was a native of Massachusetts who founded the Weston Paper Company in 1863 (which ceased to exist following its sale in 2008) and served as the 32nd Lieutenant Governor of Massachusetts from 1880 to 1883.

He came from an old New England Congregationalist family of extraordinary wealth. In 1865, he married Julia Clark Mitchell, with whom he had ten children, including Julia Carolyn Weston, mother to the well known chef Julia Child. They lived in a mansion known as Westonholme, in Dalton, Massachusetts. Byron was elected to the Massachusetts State Senate in 1876. Weston was known for his gifts to the community, including the Grace Episcopal Church in his hometown and funds towards the debt incurred for the grading and draining of an athletic field and monies toward upkeep and a grandstand at Williams College. Weston received an honorary M.A. from Williams College in 1886 and the field, still used today, was named Weston Field in his honor.

Byron's daughter Ellen Mitchell Weston married Hale Holden in 1895.

See also

 1876 Massachusetts legislature

References

External links
Byron Weston at Denver Post Online
New York Times obituary
Southworth buys Weston

1832 births
1898 deaths
Papermakers
Union Army officers
Republican Party Massachusetts state senators
Lieutenant Governors of Massachusetts
19th-century American politicians
People from Dalton, Massachusetts
Burials at Main Street Cemetery (Dalton, Massachusetts)
19th-century American businesspeople
Military personnel from Massachusetts